Barkingside is a London Underground station on the Central line. It is on the eastern edge of Barkingside (a district of Ilford) in east London at the end of a cul-de-sac off Station Road (which is itself a cul-de-sac). The station is next door to the home of Redbridge F.C. It is between Newbury Park and Fairlop stations and has been in Travelcard Zone 4 since 2 January 2007.

History

The station originally opened on 1 May 1903, as part of a Great Eastern Railway (GER) branch line from Woodford to Ilford via Hainault. This "Fairlop Loop", designed to stimulate suburban growth had a chequered history and Barkingside station was temporarily closed to passenger traffic, due to World War I economies, from 21 May 1916 until 30 June 1919. As a consequence of the 1921 Railways Act, the GER was merged with other railway companies in 1923 to become part of the London and North Eastern Railway (LNER).

As part of the 1935–1940 "New Works Programme" of the London Passenger Transport Board the majority of the loop was to be transferred to form the eastern extensions of the Central line. Although work commenced in 1938 it was suspended upon the outbreak of the Second World War in 1939 and work only recommenced in 1946. Steam train services serving Barkingside were suspended on 29 November 1947 and electrified Central line passenger services, to Central London via Gants Hill, finally commenced on 31 May 1948. The line from Newbury Park to Hainault through Barkingside had been electrified for empty train movements to the new depot at Hainault from 14 December 1947.

The station today

The station contains two platforms, one for each direction.

Few alterations took place to the station upon transfer to the Underground. Barkingside station is a "Grade II" listed building, marking it as a structure of architectural significance. Probably designed under the direction of W. N. Ashbee, the GER architect, it is dominated by a substantial brick building, surmounted by a cupola. The interior is notable for the fine hammerbeam roof to the ticket hall. Both platforms retain the ornate canopies with the "GER" initials still visible in the bracketry.

The station has toilet facilities, and a waiting room on the Westbound platform.

Services and connections

Services
The typical off-peak service in trains per hour (tph) is:
6 tph eastbound to Hainault
3 tph eastbound to Woodford via Hainault
9 tph to Ealing Broadway

Connections
London Bus routes 128, 150, 167, 169, 247, 275 and 462, and night route N8 serve the station. Furthermore, bus route 128 provide a 24-hour service.

References

External links

 London Transport Museum Photographic Archive
 
 
 

Central line (London Underground) stations
London Underground Night Tube stations
Tube stations in the London Borough of Redbridge
Grade II listed railway stations
Former Great Eastern Railway stations
Railway stations in Great Britain opened in 1903
Railway stations in Great Britain closed in 1916
Railway stations in Great Britain opened in 1919
William Neville Ashbee railway stations
Grade II listed buildings in the London Borough of Redbridge